Streets of Gold is a 1986 American drama film directed by Joe Roth, starring Klaus Maria Brandauer, Wesley Snipes and Adrian Pasdar.

Plot
Alek is an immigrant from the Soviet Union, who was not allowed on the Soviet national team because he is Jewish. One day, he meets two young amateur boxers named Roland Jenkins and Timmi Boyle and begins to coach them.

Cast

 Klaus Maria Brandauer as Alek Neuman
 Adrian Pasdar as Timmy Boyle
 Wesley Snipes as Roland Jenkins
 Ángela Molina as Elena
 Elya Baskin as Klebanov
 Daniel O'Shea as Vinnie
 John Mahoney as Linnehan

References

External links
 
 

1986 films
20th Century Fox films
1980s sports drama films
American boxing films
Films scored by Jack Nitzsche
Films shot in Los Angeles
Films shot in New Jersey
Films shot in New York City
Films directed by Joe Roth
Films with screenplays by Richard Price (writer)
Cold War films
Films produced by Joe Roth
American sports drama films
1986 directorial debut films
1986 drama films
1980s English-language films
1980s American films